Doodlin' is an album by jazz saxophonist Archie Shepp recorded in Paris, France, in November 1970 and released on the Inner City label in 1976. The album features performances by Shepp with Alan Shorter, Bob Reid and Muhammad Ali.

Reception
The Allmusic review by Ron Wynn calls the album an "Interesting, albeit flawed late '70s (sic) work with Shepp trying his hand at piano as well as his usual sax. Sometimes he makes good statements, but other times, his lack of sufficient experience can be heard. Still, it's not among his worst releases, but not his best either".

Track listing
 "Sweet Georgia Brown" (Ben Bernie, Kenneth Casey, Maceo Pinkard) - 1:53  
 "Doodlin'" (Horace Silver) - 3:53 
 "Doodlin'" [take 2] (Silver) - 6:15 CD bonus track not on original LP 
 "Invitation" (Bronislaw Kaper, Paul Francis Webster) - 8:36 
 "Worried About You" (Archie Shepp) - 4:00  
 "If You Could See Me Now" (Tadd Dameron) - 5:10 
 "More Than You Know" (Edward Eliscu, Billy Rose, Vincent Youmans) - 4:41
 "Coral Rock" (Alan Shorter) - 4:28
Recorded in Paris, France, November, 1970

Personnel
Archie Shepp – piano
Alan Shorter – flugelhorn 
Bob Reid – bass 
Muhammad Ali – drums

References

1976 albums
Archie Shepp albums
Inner City Records albums